Samuel Wilson Bartholomew (April 10, 1917 – February 14, 1999) was an American football fullback who played professionally in the National Football League (NFL) for the Philadelphia Eagles.  He played college football at the University of Tennessee and was drafted in the 13th round of the 1940 NFL Draft with the 118th overall pick by the Washington Redskins. Bartholomew was inducted to the Tennessee Sports Hall of Fame in 1986.

References

External links

1917 births
1999 deaths
American football fullbacks
Philadelphia Eagles players
Tennessee Volunteers football players
Sportspeople from Charleston, West Virginia
Players of American football from West Virginia